Procoptodon is an extinct genus of giant short-faced (sthenurine) kangaroos that lived in Australia during the Pleistocene Epoch.

The genus is derived from Simosthenurus, making the latter genus paraphyletic.

Description

Procoptodon physiology was likely similar to that of the contemporary kangaroos; however, Procoptodon goliah was characterised by its large size. These sthenurines, or short-faced kangaroos, included species that were more than three times the size of the largest kangaroos living today. These animals lived alongside modern species of kangaroos, but specialised on a diet of leaves from trees and shrubs. Procoptodon were large and short-faced, distinguishable by their flat faces and forward-pointing eyes. On each foot, they had a single large toe or claw somewhat similar in appearance to a horse's hoof. On these unusual feet, they moved quickly through the open forests and plains, where they sought grass and leaves to eat. Their front paws were equally strange; each front paw had two extra-long fingers with large claws. They may have been used to grab branches, bringing leaves within eating distance.

Distribution and habitat 
Procoptodon is mainly known for living in semiarid areas of South Australia and New South Wales. These environments were harsh, characterised by vast areas of treeless, wind-blown sand dunes. However, the area around Lake Menindee, in western New South Wales, had a cooler, wetter climate at the time Procoptodon existed. The surrounding area was a mosaic of sclerophyll forest, woodland, savannah, and plains, but sand dunes would have also formed along the edges of the Menindee. Fossilized footprints have also been found on Kangaroo Island.

Palaeobiology

Mobility 

Procoptodon was not able to hop as a mode of transportation, and would have been unable to accelerate sufficiently due to its weight. Broad hips and ankle joints, adapted to resist torsion or twisting, point to an upright posture where weight is supported by one leg at a time. Its broad hips also allowed for another important modification – large buttocks – a feature shared with other walking species.

However, some ambiguity surrounds the possible locomotion of P. goliah. Some research suggests that this species was perhaps the largest hopping mammal to have ever existed. Research suggests that the most optimal weight for a large hopping marsupial is roughly 50–60 kg. Larger animals, especially the massive P. goliah, would be substantially more at risk of tendon breakage while hopping. If P. goliah were to have travelled by hopping, the highest possible balance between size and speed would have been peaked, because its body would have been the largest possible to be carried by this method of locomotion.

A more likely suggestion, based on the apparent anatomy allowed by the bone structure of P. goliah, is that unlike modern kangaroos, which are plantigrade hoppers at high speeds and use their tails in pentapedal locomotion at slower speeds, Procoptodon was an unguligrade biped, walking in a fashion similar to hominids. Locomotion mechanics and physiology have been investigated through the examination of musculoskeletal scaling patterns. For P. goliah, tendon stress was identified, which indicates limited locomotor capabilities, exposing a correlation between body mass and locomotion abilities. Ruptures in tendons demonstrate strain in elasticity of muscles in the limbs, which provides evidence that perhaps the hypothesised ability for P. goliah to hop may have been unlikely. Due to its locomotive performance, the species may have been vulnerable to human predation. 

Fossils of giant short-faced kangaroos have been found at the Naracoorte World Heritage fossil deposits in South Australia, Lake Menindee in New South Wales, the Darling Downs in Queensland, and at many other sites. A full-sized, lifelike replica is on permanent display with other ancient native Australian animals at the Australian Museum.

Diet and molar patterns 
These animals lived alongside modern species of kangaroos, but specialised on a diet of leaves from trees and shrubs. Their robust skull architecture and shortened faces have been thought to be related to increased masseter muscles used to chew foods. Dental microwear of P. goliah supports a browsing diet. Large bicuspids, crenulated dental crowns, and a massive bony jaw present in the fossil evidence of P. goliah would have been required to process and digest a substantial amount of leafy fodder. Stable isotopic data suggest its diet consisted of plants using a C4 photosynthetic pathway, typically associated with grasses. In this case, however, chenopod saltbushes found throughout semiarid Australia were considered a more likely source of the C4 signature. [An intensification in aridity during the second half of the Pleistocene propagated the evolutionary progression of P. goliah to adapt to an abundance of dry vegetation. Evidence that P. goliah was the most widely distributed species among the Pleistocene macropodids throughout the continent shows that this species was adapted to a tougher diet than any other extinct Pleistocene sthenurine. Similar to Macropus giganteus, Procoptodon has molar patterns that indicate they had a similar, grassy, herbivorous diet (as opposed to leaves) and were grazers, but determining specific diets and preference of extinct herbivores is admittedly difficult. Through the study of isotopic composition of P. goliah tooth enamel, in addition to biomechanical bone features, dietary clues and feeding behavior have been deduced. The osteological characters furnish evidence of P. goliahs ability to handle fibrous vegetables and salt consumption. This, in turn, leads to the belief that the species needed to be close to a water source to deal with salt intake; at the same time, though, some theories are beginning to arise that limb remains indicate the ability to travel distances both to and from water sources.

Extinction 
The genus was present until at least about 45,000 years ago before going extinct, although some evidence indicates it may have survived to as recently as 18,000 years ago. Its extinction may have been due to climate shifts during the Pleistocene, or to human hunting. Those who support the hypothesis of a human-mediated extinction process cite that the arrival of humans to continental Australia occurred around the same time as the disappearance of this species. More evidence that this extinction was facilitated by human interaction is that the time period in which the extinction occurred was characterised by a relatively stable climate. However, no evidence of predation on or consumption of P. goliah by humans has been found in the fossil record.

New evidence has been found, however, which shows humans arrived 10,000–15,000 years prior to extinction.

Some researchers have speculated that the replacement of nutritious, fire-sensitive plants with less flammable, less nutritious flora brought about by human, fire-based deforestation in Australia played a large role in P. goliah and other Australian megafaunal extinctions about 50 thousand years ago (kya). However, the diet of P. goliah, primarily chenopods and Atriplex in particular, were less flammable and remained largely unaffected by fire. These diet patterns disprove theories that  P. goliah's extinction was due in large part to a reduction in food supply from fire. At the same time, because of the kangaroos' elongated breeding cycles, their ability to increase population numbers after human predation was highly limited.

Environmental factors 
Kangaroos living in dry, arid environments have been shown to exhibit higher densities of tooth enamel, caused by indirect hydration through consuming herbaceous plants. Lower levels of this enamel in P. goliah teeth found in areas with similar environmental parameters compared to the modern grazing kangaroos suggests that it relied far more heavily on free-standing water sources such as lakes and streams.

Given the larger size of P. goliah and its tendency to favor larger, free-standing water sources, episodic droughts accumulating 55 kya in the southern interior region of Australia would have certainly affected its populations. Yet, records show that such droughts had characterised this region for the previous 7 million years, with P. goliah surviving multiple intensely dry episodes during this period. Any period of significant decreases in rainfall did not occur until 5,000–10,000 years after the approximate extinction of P. goliah 45–50 kya, 20 ky before the last glacial maximum of high aridity. These factors disprove speculations that such droughts could have played a significant role in the extinction of  P. goliah.

Some evidence supports both of the claims that the extinction of P. goliah may have been due to climate shifts during the Pleistocene or to human hunting. P. goliah, depending heavily on free-standing water, was more vulnerable to drought. This can explain why the red kangaroo survived the increasing aridity and P. goliah did not. However, there is also evidence that suggests that humans could have a significant influence in the extinction of P. goliah. P. goliahs need for a constant free-standing source of water, plus its height and common habitat in open shrublands, made it more noticeable to human hunters, thus making it vulnerable to humans, who were also water-bound like it was.

References

Prehistoric macropods
Pleistocene mammals of Australia
Pleistocene marsupials
Prehistoric marsupial genera
Clawed herbivores
Fossil taxa described in 1873
Taxa named by Richard Owen